Ganeshan Periyaswamy (born 5 March 1994) is an Indian cricketer. He made his Twenty20 debut on 8 November 2019, for Tamil Nadu in the 2019–20 Syed Mushtaq Ali Trophy.

References

External links
 

1994 births
Living people
Indian cricketers
Tamil Nadu cricketers
Place of birth missing (living people)